Lees is a surname meaning "open place" and deriving from several locations in England in Buckinghamshire, Hampshire, Cheshire, Lincolnshire, Wiltshire.

Notable people with the surname include:

Andrew Lees (environmentalist) (1949–1994), British environmentalist
Andrew Lees (neurologist) (born 1947), English neurologist
Arthur Lees (rugby), English rugby union and rugby league footballer who played in the 1890s and 1900s
Arthur Lees (1908–1992), English golfer
Benjamin Lees (1924–2010), American classical music composer
Brian Lees (born 1923), Massachusetts politician
Brian Lees (geographer) (born 1944), Australian Geographer
Camilla Lees (born 1989), Australian netball player
Charles Lees (disambiguation), several people
Daryanne Lees (born 1986), Cuban-Puerto Rican model and beauty queen
David Lees (1881–1934), Scottish public health expert
Edwin Lees (1800–1887), British botanist and antiquarian
Sir Elliott Lees, 1st Baronet (1860–1908), British Conservative Party politician and soldier
Gabriel Lees (born 1990), French-British ski mountaineer
Geoffrey Lees (cricketer) (1920–2012), English cricketer
Geoffrey Lees (footballer) (1933–2019), English footballer
Geoff Lees (racing driver) (born 1951), English racing driver
George Harmon Lees (fl. 1911–1912), mayor of Hamilton, Ontario
Harcourt Lees (1776–1852), Irish political pamphleteer
Harrington Clare Lees (1870–1929), Anglican archbishop of Melbourne
James Lees-Milne (1908–1997), English writer and expert on country houses
Jack Lees (footballer) (1892–1983), English footballer
Jim Lees (1919–2004), Commissioner of the New South Wales Police
Joanne Lees (born 1973), British girlfriend of Peter Falconio (murder victim in Australia)
John Lees (disambiguation), several people
Marjory Lees (1878–1970), British suffragist and politician
Meg Lees (born 1948), member of the Australian Senate
Merv Lees, Australian rugby league footballer
Nathaniel Lees (born 1972), New Zealand actor and theatre director
Paris Lees, British journalist and activist
Robert Lees (1912–2004), American television and film screenwriter
Robert Lees (linguist) (1922–1996), American linguist
Robert James Lees (1849–1931) British spiritualist and medium
Sarah Lees (1842–1935), English politician, activist and philanthropist
Sue Lees (1941–2002), English academic, activist, feminist and writer
Susan H. Lees, American anthropologist and human ecologist
Terry Lees (born 1952), English footballer
Tom Lees (born 1990), English footballer
Walter Lees (cricketer) (1875–1924), English Test cricketer
Walter Edwin Lees (1887–1957), American aviator
Warren Lees (born 1952), New Zealand Test cricketer

The Lees family of Oldham.

Lees is a small suburb of Oldham located on the old Lancashire Yorkshire border.
The name Lees is an old Saxon word for the field systems that developed in this locality... lees meaning literally 'field'.

In this area of South East Lancashire along with Oldham many  former cotton producing towns such as Bolton,Bury,Middleton,Royton,Crompton and Chadderton, there are many families who still bear the name of Lees.
A Lees Hall once stood on the outskirts of Oldham which was demolished in the mid nineteenth century and unfortunately there are no surviving images.
The Parish records of the town are littered with name of Lees dating back to the fourteenth century.

Given name
 Sir Lees Knowles, 1st Baronet

References

English-language surnames